Tumulus is a Russian progressive folk metal band from Yaroslavl, Russia. They were formed from the ashes of cult doom metal/viking metal band Scald, after the death of Scald's frontman Agyl. From the beginning, Tumulus moved away from Scald's doom metal roots and played folk metal, combining metal music with traditional Russian folk and incorporated instruments as flute, tambourine and balalaika.

History
Russian Tumulus (not to be confused with the German viking/pagan/black metal band Tumulus) was founded in the fall of 1997 in Yaroslavl, Russia by ex-members of cult doom metal/viking metal band Scald that split up due to the death of the singer and leader of the band Agyl. The name of the new band – Tumulus – is a tribute to his memory and also a title of one of the songs from “Will of the Gods is Great Power” album. Tumulus started working on their own music by putting together elements of ethnic Russian music, progressive rock and progressive metal, ambient music elements.
Tumulus musicians describe their music as "art progressive folk metal"; they use clear leading vocals and folk instruments in the studio and live. Lyrics are written in Russian, ancient Slavonic and English. The lyrics is based on Slavonic spell formulas, rites and everyday magic (that mostly are traditions of northern regions of Russia). 
After recording two demos - “Krada” (1999) and “Vo Luzeh” (2000), Tumulus started co-operation with a Russian label Wroth Emitter Productions that released their studio albums “Winter Wood” (2004) and “Sredokresie” (2005). Guest vocals on both albums were performed by Marina Sokolova of a folk band Sedmaya Voda – a Russian folk songstresses. 
At the end of 2006, Tumulus went on their “Folk Art Path” tour and performed live in Russia, Ukraine, Romania and Bulgaria. One of those live shows, which took place in Sofia, Bulgaria, was recorded and released later, in December 2006, as a live album called “Live Balkan Path” (also on Wroth Emitter Productions). At the end of 2008 the band released a new EP called “Kochevonov Plyas”.
In the beginning of 2010 on a label "2S Productions" is realised new album "Vedai" (by the limited edition - only for Russia).
In the summer of 2011, this album was re-released under the title "Vedai - Sacred Knowledge of the Bearland" by Romanian label "Ygghdrassil Productions" for distribution outside of Russia. This re-release contains two exclusive bonus tracks, unavailable on the previous Russian edition.

In early 2013, Tumulus has provided a free download three song single "Skomrah" (which includes a cover version of the cult Yugoslav folk rock band Bijelo Dugme). On official band page "V Kontakte" was officially announced that, from 2013, Tumulus is a studio project.

Line up

Current members
 Kuchma – lead vocals, flute
 Velingor – bass, tambourine, percussion, backing vocals
 Kurbat – guitars, backing vocal
 Yish – guitars
 Ottar – drums & percussion
 Masha Chirkova – studio & concerts session female vocals & flutes

Former members
 Harald – guitars
 Igreny – guitars, balalaika
 Zus Obmorokh – guitars
 Karry – guitars
 Vigdis – keyboards
 Vechernica (Lilith) – keyboards
 Al'virius – keyboards, balalaika, back vocal

Discography
Hymns And Dirges (EP 1995)
Wodureid (EP 1998)
Krada (demo, 1999)
Vo Luzeh (demo, 2000)
Winter Wood (full-length, 2004, Wroth Emitter)	
Sredokresie (full-length, 2005, Wroth Emitter)	
Live Balkan Path (live album, 2006, Wroth Emitter)
Kochevonov Plyas (EP, 2008, Wroth Emitter)
Vedai (full-length, 2010, 2S Prod; limited edition for Russia only)
Vedai - Sacred knowledge of the Bearland (full-length, 2011, Ygghdrassil Production)
Skomrah (single, 2013, independent)

References

Musical groups established in 1997
Russian progressive metal musical groups
Russian folk metal musical groups